Snake charmer or snake charming most commonly refers to the Indian practice of "hypnotizing" snakes.

Snake charmer may also refer to:

Music
Snake charmer song, also known as "The Streets of Cairo", or "The Poor Little Country Maid"
"Snake charmer" (song) by Teddy Powell  (composer) and Leonard Whitcup (lyricist), published 1937
Snakecharmer (album), by Sort Sol
Snake Charmer (EP), an EP by Jah Wobble, The Edge and Holger Czukay
"Snake Charmer" (Rainbow song), by Rainbow on their 1975 album Ritchie Blackmore's Rainbow
"Snake Charmer" (song), by Panjabi MC
"Snakecharmer", a song by the band Rage Against The Machine from the album Evil Empire
Snakecharmer, a band and their eponymous debut album headed by Micky Moody

Arts
The Snake Charmer, an oil-on-canvas Orientalist painting by French artist Jean-Léon Gérôme produced around 1879.
The Snake Charmer (Rousseau), 1907 painting by French artist Henri Rousseau
Snake-charmer stone, a picture stone found at Smiss, När socken, Gotland, Sweden

Other
Snake Charmer (shotgun), a .410 gauge, stainless steel, single shot, break-action shotgun
A famous "incident" on the UK game show Catchphrase
Bill (Kill Bill), also known as Snake Charmer, a character from the Kill Bill films

See also
Snake handling (disambiguation)